Wood grain most commonly refers to the texture and appearance of the wood fibres.

Wood grain can also mean:

 Wood Grain Wheel, a single from a Slim Thug album.
 "Woodgrain", a song by Modest Mouse on the album, Blue Cadet-3, Do You Connect?